Alfred Burrows (1952 – 16 August 2015) was an Indian cricketer. He played twenty first-class matches for Railways between 1978 and 1986.

References

External links
 

1952 births
2015 deaths
Indian cricketers
Railways cricketers
Cricketers from Chennai